Maurice Gover (born 2 May 1932) is a British cross-country skier. He competed in the men's 15 kilometre event at the 1956 Winter Olympics.

References

1932 births
Living people
British male cross-country skiers
Olympic cross-country skiers of Great Britain
Cross-country skiers at the 1956 Winter Olympics
People from Richmond, North Yorkshire